Sergey Solodovnikov (born 2 November 1958) is a Belarusian professional football coach and former player. Since 2011 till 2016 he was a head coach for Neman Grodno.

Honours
Neman Grodno
Belarusian Cup winner: 1992–93

References

External links
 Profile at pressball.by

1958 births
Living people
Sportspeople from Irkutsk
Soviet footballers
Soviet expatriate footballers
Association football forwards
Belarusian footballers
Belarusian expatriate footballers
Expatriate footballers in Poland
Belarusian Premier League players
FC Neman Grodno players
Jagiellonia Białystok players
FC Belcard Grodno players
Belarusian football managers
FC Neman Grodno managers
FC Dinamo Minsk managers
FC Lida managers